David Gald (born 10 July 1968 in Stryn, Norway) is a Norwegian Jazz musician (tuba), known for collaborations with such musicians as Bjørn Alterhaug, Arve Henriksen and Trygve Seim and on a series of album releases.

Career 
Gald established the jazz band Riverside Jazz Ensemble together with Arve Henriksen, inspired by the Ytre Suløens Jass-ensemble, which he later participated on many recordings with (1992–). After attending the Toneheim folkehøgskole (1988–89) he studied jazz on Jazz program at Trondheim Musikkonsevatorium (1989–95), and collaborated within the Bodega Band, Aggravatin Papa and Trondhjems Kunstorkester. Later he worked with Oslo Groove Company, Trygve Seim Orchestra on Different Rivers (2000), and within 1300 Oslo, and has since 2000 toured with Rikskonsertene in the production Gumbo, releasing the album Gumbo (2005). He has participated om about 20 albums, and is today (2013) member of the jazz orchestras Ytre Suløens Jass-Ensemble, Funky Butt and Gumbo.

Discography 

With Bjørn Alterhaug 
1991: Constellations (Odin Records)

Within Epinastic Movements
1993: Rapid (Pop Eye)

Within Ytre Suløens Jass-Ensemble
1994: Where the Blue of the Night Meets the Gold of the Day
1996: Art Deco
1997: In Concert – the Weary Blues
1999: Blue River (Herman Records)
2005: Memories of New Orleans – 30 Years of Recorded History

With Trygve Seim 
2000: Different Rivers (ECM Records), feat. Arve Henriksen, Håvard Lund & Hild Sofie Tafjord

Within Funky Butt
2001: Whoopin''' (Sonor Records)
2003: The Glove (Sonor Records)
2005: Big Mama (Schmell Records)
2007: Shakin' da Butt (Schmell Records)

Within Gumbo
2006: Gumbo'' (Schmell Records)

References

External links 
 
 
 

20th-century Norwegian tubists
21st-century Norwegian tubists
Norwegian jazz tubists
Norwegian jazz composers
Male jazz composers
ECM Records artists
Norwegian University of Science and Technology alumni
Musicians from Stryn
1968 births
Living people
20th-century Norwegian male musicians
21st-century Norwegian male musicians
Funky Butt (band) members